The Tarkio River (also known as the Big Tarkio River) is a non-navigable river that stretches for approximately  from Cass County, Iowa to its mouth on the Missouri River in Holt County, Missouri.

The name "Tarkio" is from a Native American word meaning "place where walnuts grow".

The river passes rural areas and figures most prominently in the drainage system nears its mouth in management of Big Lake, Missouri and the Squaw Creek National Wildlife Refuge.  Several streams and ditches in the Missouri River bottoms near its mouth contain the Tarkio name.

Course
The river starts as an arroyo in Cass County, Iowa southeast of Griswold, Iowa and becomes a full stream just south of the county line in Montgomery County, Iowa north of Stanton, Iowa and heads south through Montgomery County into Page County, Iowa passing Coin, Iowa. It enters Missouri in Atchison County, Missouri at Blanchard, Iowa.  It passes Tarkio, Missouri and Fairfax, Missouri (which is the main gage for river reporting). It enters Holt County near Corning, Missouri and enters the Missouri River at river mile (RM) 507 or river kilometer (RK) 816. The river has a mean annual discharge of 244 cubic feet per second at Fairfax.

Other streams with Tarkio name
There are several streams with the Tarkio name in the Missouri River bottoms near where the Tarkio meets the Missouri.  Almost none of the streams actually flows into the Tarkio although some are historically part of the river.

Old Channel Tarkio River - The river originally flowed further south along the base of the bluffs by Craig, Missouri.  It now drains into Little Tarkio Creek.
Little Tarkio Creek - The creek which begins in the bluffs above the Missouri flows on the east side of Big Lake and passes Fortescue, Missouri before emptying into the Missouri at RM 493 (RK 793).
Old Channel Little Tarkio Creek - The creek flows on the west side of Squaw Creek National Wildlife Refuge and drains into Little Tarkio Ditch
Little Tarkio Ditch - The ditch drains the water from the Squaw Creek National Wildlife Refuge and drains into the Missouri at approximately RM 485 (RK 781).

Flooding
The drainage of the river through the flatlands of the Missouri can sometimes lead to spectacular floods when the river cannot drain.  In the Great Flood of 1993 flooding caused Interstate 29 to be closed near the mouth.  In the 2011 Missouri River floods, the Tarkio River and its other namesakes overwashed an area from Fortescue to the Missouri River totally obliterating Big Lake.  On July 7, 2011 the river rose  in six hours in one burst at Fairfax.

See also
List of rivers of Iowa

References

External links
geonames.usgs.gov profile

Rivers of Iowa
Rivers of Missouri
Lewis and Clark Expedition
Tributaries of the Missouri River
Rivers of Cass County, Iowa
Rivers of Holt County, Missouri
Rivers of Montgomery County, Iowa
Rivers of Page County, Iowa
Rivers of Atchison County, Missouri